Zhengyi railway station ("justice") is a railway station in Lingya District, Kaohsiung, Taiwan. It is on the Pingtung line and is operated by Taiwan Railways. It is served by all local trains.

Zhengyi station was opened as part of the Kaohsiung moving its at-grade railroad underground to improve traffic. It was opened along with seven other new stations on the West Coast and Pingtung lines.

References

2018 establishments in Taiwan
Railway stations opened in 2018
Railway stations in Kaohsiung
Railway stations served by Taiwan Railways Administration